Ćazim Suljić (born 29 October 1996) is a footballer who plays as a midfielder for Italian  club Piacenza. Born in France, he represented Bosnia and Herzegovina at youth international level.

Club career
Suljić is a youth product of Saint-Étienne. He made his Coupe de la Ligue debut on 16 December 2015 against Paris Saint-Germain. He played the full game.

On 11 July 2019, he signed with Alessandria.

On 28 January 2021, he joined Piacenza on a 2.5-year contract.

References

1996 births
Living people
People from Saint-Priest-en-Jarez
French people of Bosnia and Herzegovina descent
Citizens of Bosnia and Herzegovina through descent
French footballers
Bosnia and Herzegovina footballers
Association football midfielders
Championnat National 2 players
Championnat National 3 players
AS Saint-Étienne players
Serie A players
Serie C players
F.C. Crotone players
A.C. Cuneo 1905 players
U.S. Alessandria Calcio 1912 players
Piacenza Calcio 1919 players
Slovenian PrvaLiga players
NK Ankaran players
Bosnia and Herzegovina expatriate footballers
Bosnia and Herzegovina expatriate sportspeople in Italy
Bosnia and Herzegovina expatriate sportspeople in Slovenia
Expatriate footballers in Italy
Expatriate footballers in Slovenia
Bosnia and Herzegovina youth international footballers
Sportspeople from Loire (department)
Footballers from Auvergne-Rhône-Alpes